Events in the year 1960 in Brazil.

Incumbents

Federal government
 President: Juscelino Kubitschek
 Vice President: João Goulart

Governors 
 Alagoas: Sebastião Muniz Falcão 
 Amazonas: Gilberto Mestrinho
 Bahia:	Juracy Magalhães 
 Ceará: Parsifal Barroso 
 Espírito Santo:Raul Giuberti
 Goiás: José Feliciano Ferreira 
 Guanabara: José Sette Câmara Filho (until 5 December); Carlos Lacerda (from 5 December)
 Maranhão: 
 Mato Grosso: João Ponce de Arruda
 Minas Gerais: José Francisco Bias Fortes 
 Pará: Luís de Moura Carvalho 
 Paraíba: Pedro Gondim (until 18 March); José Fernandes de Lima (from 18 March)
 Paraná: Moisés Lupion
 Pernambuco: Cid Sampaio 
 Piauí: Chagas Rodrigues 
 Rio de Janeiro: Roberto Silveira                                                                 
 Rio Grande do Norte: Dinarte de Medeiros Mariz 
 Rio Grande do Sul: Leonel Brizola 
 Santa Catarina: Heriberto Hülse 
 São Paulo: Carlos Alberto Alves de Carvalho Pinto 
 Sergipe: Luís Garcia

Vice governors
 Alagoas: Sizenando Nabuco de Melo 
 Bahia: Orlando Moscoso 
 Ceará: Wilson Gonçalves 
 Espírito Santo: Raul Giuberti 
 Goiás: João de Abreu 
 Maranhão: Alexandre Alves Costa 
 Mato Grosso: Henrique José Vieira Neto 
 Minas Gerais: Artur Bernardes Filho 
 Paraíba: Pedro Gondim 
 Pernambuco: Pelópidas da Silveira 
 Piauí: Tibério Nunes 
 Rio de Janeiro: Celso Peçanha 
 Rio Grande do Norte: José Augusto Varela 
 Santa Catarina: vacant
 São Paulo: Porfírio da Paz 
 Sergipe: Dionísio Machado

Events

April 
 April 21 - The planned city of Brasília is inaugurated and becomes the country's new capital, replacing Rio de Janeiro. The old federal district of which Rio was part becomes the state of Guanabara.

June 
 June 1 - A 22nd star representing the state of Guanabara is added to the flag of Brazil.

Deaths

References

See also 
1960 in Brazilian football
List of Brazilian films of 1960

 
1960s in Brazil
Years of the 20th century in Brazil
Brazil
Brazil